K-Z is a 1972 Italian short documentary film directed by Giorgio Treves. It was nominated for an Academy Award for Best Documentary Short.

References

External links

1972 films
1972 documentary films
1972 short films
1970s Italian-language films
Italian short documentary films
1970s Italian films